New Mal Junction (station code NMZ)   is the major and very important among two railway stations which serves Malbazar town, the other being Malbazar Railway Station (code MLBZ). This station is commonly known as Mal, It lies in Jalpaiguri district of West Bengal. New Mal Junction lies on two railway line New Jalpaiguri–Alipurduar–Samuktala Road line and is the originating point of New Mal–Changrabandha–New Cooch Behar line. New Mal is the headquarter station of Sub-Divisional Railway officer designated as Assistant Divisional Engineer.

Trains
Trains serving this station are listed below:

Major trains
New Jalpaiguri–Alipurduar Tourist Special.
Delhi Junction - Alipurduar Mahananda Express
Sealdah - Alipurduar Kanchan Kanya Express
Kamakhya-Patna Capital Express
Jhajha–Dibrugarh Express
Ranchi–Kamakhya Express
Puri–Kamakhya Express via Howrah
 Alipurduar - Secunderabad Express
Siliguri Junction - Alipurduar Intercity Express
Siliguri Junction - Dhubri Intercity Express
Siliguri Junction - Bamanhat Express.

Other trains
 55725 - Alipurduar–New Jalpaiguri Passenger
 55467 - Bamanhat–Siliguri Passenger
 75716 - Dinhata–Siliguri DEMU
 07513 - Bamanhat -Siliguri Junction DEMU Special (via Changrabandha)
 77525 - Siliguri-New Bongaigaon DEMU
 75714 - New Cooch Behar–Siliguri Jn DEMU (via Changrabandha)
 75741 - Siliguri junction - Dhubri DEMU
 05777 - New Jalpaiguri–Alipurduar Passenger special
 75717 - Siliguri Junction - Bamanhat DEMU
 07525 - New Bongaigaon - Siliguri Jn. DEMU Special (via Dhubri - Mathabhanga)

References

Railway stations in Jalpaiguri district
Railway junction stations in West Bengal
Alipurduar railway division